Shah Jahan Begum was the Chancellor of Jamia Millia Islamia who served as First Lady of India. She was the spouse of Zakir Husain.

She observed purdah as a strict Muslim, and therefore kept a low profile.

References 

First ladies and gentlemen of India
Heads of universities and colleges in India
Academic staff of Jamia Millia Islamia